Aaron Dantianto Pearson (born August 22, 1964) is a former American football linebacker who played three seasons with the Kansas City Chiefs of the National Football League. He was drafted by the Kansas City Chiefs in the eleventh round of the 1986 NFL Draft. He first enrolled at Itawamba Junior College before transferring to Mississippi State University. Pearson attended Gadsden High School.

Controversy 
Pearson was shot in a dispute after breaking a car's windshield.

References

External links
Just Sports Stats

Living people
1964 births
Players of American football from Alabama
American football linebackers
African-American players of American football
Itawamba Indians football players
Mississippi State Bulldogs football players
Kansas City Chiefs players
Sportspeople from Gadsden, Alabama
21st-century African-American people
20th-century African-American sportspeople